Hugh White (November 7, 1876 – June 11, 1936) was an American football player.  He played for the University of Michigan from 1898 to 1901, and captained the national championship-winning 1901 team.

Early life and education
White was born in Lapeer, Michigan, in 1876, the son of Henry Kirke White and Jane Wigglesworth White. His father had run away from home as a boy, crewed on a whaling ship, participated in the California Gold Rush, and fought in the American Civil War. White received a Ph.B in 1899 and an LL.B. in 1902 from the University of Michigan.

College football career
White played left tackle for the Michigan during the 1898 season, left end in the 1899 season, and returned to left tackle in the 1900 and 1901 seasons. As a senior, he captained the 1901 Michigan Wolverines football team, the first of Fielding H. Yost's famous "Point-a-Minute" teams, which went undefeated with an 11–0 record, outscored their opponents 550–0, and defeated Stanford in the inaugural Rose Bowl, 49–0.  In the Rose Bowl, Michigan put the ball in play 142 times for 1,463 offensive yards. Stanford coach Charles Fickert, asked Michigan coach Yost to stop the game, since his team was no match for Michigan, but Yost insisted the game continue.  Yost had been ousted as Stanford's coach the year before. With eight minutes left in the game, White agreed with Stanford captain, R. S. Fisher, to stop play.

Later life
In early 1902, White was considered for the football coaching job at Haskell Institute—now known as Haskell Indian Nations University—in Lawrence, Kansas and applied for the same post at Purdue University. In June 1902, he was hired as the football coach at Washington University in St. Louis. He married Abbie E. Cutting of Lapeer, Michigan, in 1903. They were the parents of three daughters, Elizabeth, Martha, and Marion. In 1904, White umpired Ivy League football games. He later worked as an engineer and became president (1924–1927) and Chairman of the Board (1927–1933) of the George A. Fuller Company, one of the largest construction companies in the United States, which erected major public buildings such as the Lincoln Memorial (1918), the United States Supreme Court Building (1933), and major office buildings. White served as Village President of Scarsdale, New York. He died of pneumonia on June 11, 1936, after a brief illness.

Head coaching record

References

External links
 

1876 births
1936 deaths
19th-century players of American football
American athlete-politicians
American civil engineers
American football ends
American football tackles
Michigan Wolverines football players
Washington University Bears football coaches
People from Lapeer, Michigan
People from Scarsdale, New York
Politicians from Westchester County, New York
Sportspeople from Metro Detroit
Coaches of American football from Michigan
Players of American football from Michigan
Engineers from Michigan
Engineers from New York (state)